Les+ Magazine is a Beijing-based community magazine. It was started in 2005 by a group of young Chinese lesbians, or lalas (Chinese: 拉拉; pinyin: lālā). Les+ is the first magazine for queer women in China, which has a growing lesbian culture.

Origins 
Jing Zhao was one of the women who founded Les+ in 2005, China's first and only queer women's magazine. The magazine surfaced from the growing online culture of forums and chatrooms in China in the 2000s. In 1999, the first online lala forum was created.
The slogan on the cover of the first issue states: "After the darkness fades away, I’ll be holding your hand, walking under the sunlight with pride, boldly and happily living our lives!".

Lesbian culture in China 
Although homosexuality has been legal in China since 1997, LGBT people continue to face social oppression and are not protected from discrimination by law. According to Xin Huang, Les+ exists within a growing lesbian culture: "In 2007 when I conducted the fieldwork for this research, lesbians in China have a national organization, Tongyu, their own magazine, Les+, and a club called lala, which holds weekly meetings in some large cities, as well as a lala website."

References 

Lesbian culture in Asia
Literary magazines published in China
LGBT in China
LGBT rights in China
Sexuality in China
Lesbian-related magazines